What the World Needs Now... is the  tenth studio album by British rock band Public Image Ltd.  It was released on September 4, 2015.

Reception
{{Album ratings
| MC = 72/100
| rev1 = Allmusic
| rev1Score = 
| rev2 = Drowned in Sound
| rev2Score = 4/10
| rev3 = Mojo
| rev3Score = | rev4 = NME| rev4Score = 7/10
| rev5 = The Observer| rev5Score = 
| rev6 = Pitchfork Media
| rev6Score = 6.8/10
| rev7 = Punknews.org
| rev7Score = 
| rev8 = Q| rev8Score = 
| rev9 = Spin
| rev9Score = 7/10
| rev10 = Uncut
| rev10Score = 7/10}}What the World Needs Now... received mostly favourable reviews from music critics. At Metacritic, which assigns a normalised rating out of 100 to reviews from mainstream critics, the album received an average score of 72 based on 17 reviews, which indicates "generally favorable reviews".

Track listing

Personnel
Personnel adapted from What the World Needs Now'' liner notes.

Public Image Ltd.
 John Lydon – vocals, production, cover art
 Lu Edmonds – guitar, saz, piano, cümbüs, production
 Scott Firth – bass guitar, keyboards, strings, percussion, production
 Bruce Smith – drums, percussion, programming, production

Other personnel
 John "Rambo" Stevens – production, layout
 James Towler – production, engineering, mixing
 Tom Colwill – assistant engineering
 John Dent – mastering
 Tomohiro Noritsume – booklet photography

Charts

References

External links
 Xfm.co.uk

Public Image Ltd albums
2015 albums